Karaca Dağ is a shield volcano located in southeastern Turkey, near Diyarbakır.

It was also known as "Mount Masia", Which in turn was used to give the title of an iris found on the mountain, as Iris masia.

History

Researchers at the Max Planck Institute for Plant Breeding Research in Cologne discovered that the genetically common ancestor of 68 contemporary types of cereal still grows as a wild plant on the slopes of Mount Karaca (Karacadag).

See also 
 List of volcanoes in Turkey
 Karapınar Field
 Mount Judi
 Thamanin

References 

Mountains of Turkey
Volcanoes of Turkey
Polygenetic shield volcanoes
Landforms of Şanlıurfa Province
Landforms of Diyarbakır Province
Important Bird Areas of Turkey
Noah's Ark
Tomb of Noah